"Kiss and Swallow" is the first single to be taken from IAMX's debut album Kiss + Swallow.  The song is highly erotic and deals with prostitution.

The single was available in physical form as CDS and 12". It was also released as a digital download. On 3 July 2020 the digital download version was re-released.

The video was filmed in black, white and pink and shows Chris in silhouette form as he dances about, surrounded by various things that pop up on the screen.

Track listing

CDS 
Tennis Schallplatten, CDS. Track listing:

The digital download version contains exactly the same track listing.

12" 
Moonbootique Recordings, gramophone record 12". Track listing:
 site A

 site B

References 

Songs about kissing
Songs about prostitutes
2004 songs
IAMX songs
Songs written by Chris Corner